Thomas William Lang (22 June 1854 – ) was an English first-class cricketer. He was a right-handed batsman and a roundarm right-arm medium pace bowler who played from 1872 to 1875 for Oxford University Cricket Club and Gloucestershire County Cricket Club. Lang was born at Selkirk, Scotland.

Lang made 18 first-class appearances, scoring 303 runs @ 13.17 with a highest innings of 54, his sole half-century. He held 9 catches and took 76 wickets @ 14.52 with a best analysis of 6–27. He took 10 wickets in a match on one occasion and five wickets in an innings on five occasions.

Lang was educated at Loretto School, Clifton College and Balliol College, Oxford. He became a stockbroker. He died at Virginia Water, Surrey on 26 December 1894.

References

1854 births
1902 deaths
19th-century English businesspeople
Alumni of Balliol College, Oxford
Cricketers from Selkirk, Scottish Borders
English cricketers of 1864 to 1889
English cricketers
English stockbrokers
Gloucestershire cricketers
Oxford University cricketers
People educated at Clifton College
People educated at Loretto School, Musselburgh